Xu Jialing (born 25 August 2002) is a Chinese Paralympic swimmer. She represented China at the 2016 Summer Paralympics held in Rio de Janeiro, Brazil and she won three medals: the gold medal in the women's 100 metre butterfly S9 event, the bronze medal in the women's 400 metre freestyle S9 event and the bronze medal in the women's 4 × 100 metre freestyle relay 34pts event. She also competed at the 2020 Summer Paralympics in Tokyo, Japan.

In 2018, she competed at the 2018 Asian Para Games held in Jakarta, Indonesia. She won five individual gold medals and two individual silver medals. She also won the gold medal in the women's  freestyle relay and women's  medley relay competitions.

References

External links 
 

Living people
2002 births
Sportspeople from Ningbo
Chinese female butterfly swimmers
Chinese female freestyle swimmers
Swimmers at the 2016 Summer Paralympics
Swimmers at the 2020 Summer Paralympics
Medalists at the 2016 Summer Paralympics
Paralympic gold medalists for China
Paralympic bronze medalists for China
Paralympic medalists in swimming
Chinese amputees
Paralympic swimmers of China
S9-classified Paralympic swimmers
21st-century Chinese women
Medalists at the 2018 Asian Para Games